Epiperipatus hilkae is a species of velvet worm in the Peripatidae family. This species is dark brown with a series of reddish brown hexagons down its back. Males of this species have 25 to 27 pairs of legs; females have 28 to 29. The type locality is in Costa Rica.

References

Onychophorans of tropical America
Onychophoran species
Animals described in 1990